The 12th Northwest Territories Legislative Assembly was the 19th assembly of the territorial government and lasted from 1991 until it was dissolved in 1995.

This was the first legislature to meet in the body's permanent home when that building was completed in 1993.

References

External links
Northwest Territories Legislative Assembly homepage

Northwest Territories Legislative Assemblies